"I'm So Hot" is a song recorded by South Korean girl group Momoland. It was released on March 20, 2019 by MLD Entertainment and distributed by Kakao M as the lead single from the group's fifth extended play Show Me. The Japanese version of the song was released as a CD single by King Records on May 7, 2019. The track was written by Shinsadong Tiger and Beom x Nang, with Shinsadong Tiger credited as the producer.

The accompanying music video for the song was uploaded onto 1theK's YouTube channel simultaneously with the single's release. To promote the single, the group performed on several South Korean music show programs, such as M Countdown and Inkigayo. Commercially, "I'm So Hot" peaked at number eighty-one on South Korea's Gaon Digital Chart.

Composition

"I'm so Hot is an electropop song. The song was written, composed and produced by Shinsadong Tiger, while Beom x Nang received writing and composition credits. Described by Tamar Herman of Billboard as a song that "jumps between melodies, throwing in jazzy brass and quirky synths over squelchy Eurodance-inspired beats."

Background and release
Momoland released their fourth extended play Fun to the World with its lead single "Baam" in June 2018. Following the release of "Baam", it was announced on February 12, 2019 by MLD Entertainment that the group would be returning in March 2019 with a new album. On March 14, 2019, it was announced that members Daisy and Taeha will be taking a break due to health and personal issues and not participate for the promotions of "I'm So Hot".

"I'm So Hot" served as the first single from Momoland without members Daisy and Taeha since their 2016 debut single "Jjan! Koong! Kwang!". Prior to the release of the song, teasers featuring photos of Momoland from the extended play's photoshoot, a snippet of the song and clips from its music video were released online in March 2019. The song was officially released on March 20, 2019 by MLD Entertainment and distributed by Kakao M as the group's sixth single. It served as the lead single of their fifth extended play, Show Me. An instrumental of the song was included in the extended play as the sixth track. The dance practice video was uploaded on March 25, 2019.

The Japanese version was released on May 7, 2019. It was included in the 2019 release of the group's debut studio album, Chiri Chiri.

In January 2020, MLD Entertainment said they decided to exclude Daisy from promotions of "I'm So Hot" in March 2019, after not receiving a "clear" response from Daisy regarding her duties in the group at the time.

Critical reception
Tássia Assis of MTV News stated the track's "brassy, over the top melody pairs well with the flashy confidence and it's the perfect score to play while taking over the stage." Amber Miley of The Kraze Magazine described the song as "full brass and percussion", and that it was "reminiscent of old school burlesque show music."

Commercial performance
In South Korea, "I'm So Hot" debuted in the Gaon Digital Chart at number one hundred nine on the week of March 23, 2019, making it the third song from Momoland to enter the chart. The song peaked at number eighty-one during its second week on the week of March 30, 2019.

In Japan, the Japanese version of "I'm So Hot" peaked at number eight on the Oricon Singles Chart.

Music videos

The music video for "I'm So Hot" was uploaded to 1theK's official YouTube channel on March 20, 2019, in conjunction with the release of the single. The video features the group playing around in fitting rooms inbetween dancing scenes. Other scenes feature the group in a school bus and a dimly-lit hallway.

The music video for the Japanese version of the song was uploaded to J-Rock's official YouTube channel on March 31, 2019.

Live performances
Momoland promoted "I'm So Hot" by performing on several music programs in South Korea including Inkigayo, M Countdown, Music Bank, The Show, Show Champion and Show! Music Core.

Track listing

Charts

Accolades

Music program awards

Credits and personnel
Credits adapted from Melon.
 Momoland – vocals
 Beom x Nang – composer, lyricist
 Shinsadong Tiger – composer, lyricist, arrangement

Release history

References

Momoland songs
2019 singles
2019 songs
Electropop songs
Japanese-language songs
Kakao M singles
King Records (Japan) singles
Korean-language songs
Song recordings produced by Shinsadong Tiger
Songs written by Shinsadong Tiger